Daniel Pérez Calvo (born 1966) is a Spanish journalist and politician. After working for Atresmedia from 1991 to 2019, he joined the Citizens party and led them in the 2019 Aragonese regional election.

Biography
Born in Barcelona, Pérez Calvo graduated in Information Sciences from the University of Navarre. He spent most of his journalistic career with Atresmedia, joining their Zaragoza delegation as an editor in 1991. In February 2012, he was named as regional director of Atresmedia's radio station Onda Cero and regional delegate of its television channel Antena 3, following the death of his predecessor Ricardo Lizarraga.

In January 2019, Pérez Calvo was chosen by Citizens leader Albert Rivera to be their officially endorsed candidate in primaries to lead the party in the 2019 Aragonese regional election, replacing Susana Gaspar. In March, he won the eight-man primary with 81% of the votes, in which he was the only candidate not registered as a party member.

Citizens came third in the May 2019 elections, increasing their seats from 5 to 12 and their percentage from 9.4% to 16.7%. Pérez Calvo was open to forming a coalition with the Spanish Socialist Workers' Party (PSOE) of incumbent regional president Javier Lambán, who instead chose to pact with left-wing parties for his second government.

In May 2021, Citizens' national leader Inés Arrimadas named Pérez Calvo the party's vice secretary-general.

References

1966 births
Living people
Politicians from Barcelona
Journalists from Catalonia
University of Navarra alumni
Spanish radio journalists
Spanish television journalists
Citizens (Spanish political party) politicians
Members of the Cortes of Aragon